Alessandro "Sandro" Cortese (born 6 January 1990) is a former German motorcycle racer, who last competed in 2020 World Superbike Championship for Team Pedercini. He lives in Berkheim, Germany.

Cortese contested every race from his Grand Prix début in  until the 2016 French Grand Prix, where he missed the race due to a knee injury.

Career

Early career
Cortese was born in Ochsenhausen, West Germany, as the son of an Italian father and a German mother. He started his career at the age of nine on pocket bikes and was European Pocket Bike champion as well as German Mini Bike champion. He competed in the German IDM Championship in the 125cc class, finishing 10th.

125cc World Championship

Cortese made his 125cc World Championship debut with Kiefer-Bos-Castrol Honda in 2005, finishing the season in 26th place with 8 points. His best finish was 14th place in Germany, the Czech Republic, and Turkey. In 2006, he switched to the  125cc Championship-winning team, Elit – Caffè Latte Honda as team mate to 125cc World Champion Thomas Lüthi. He made steady progress scoring some championship points, His best result was in the Portuguese Grand Prix in 10th place, improving his championship standing to 17th place with 23 points.

In 2007 his team was renamed Emmi – Caffè Latte and it switched to Aprilia motorbikes. Lüthi moved up to 250cc, also with Aprilia. Cortese improved in 2007, finishing most of the season's races in the top 10, including 7th places in the French, the Italian and German Grands Prix. He finished the championship in 14th place with 66 points. For 2008 he rode a works Aprilia RSA 125. The 2008 season started poorly for him, finishing outside the top 8 at the first five races. His fortunes changed for the better after Mugello and he finished consistently in the top eight. In the Australian Grand Prix he crashed while leading but managed to recover to sixth and helped Mike Di Meglio to win the championship by finishing ahead of Simone Corsi, Di Meglio's championship rival. In the Malaysian Grand Prix he rode the fastest lap of the race despite starting 18th on the grid to finish fourth. He was the only 125cc rider to finish all races that year, gaining points in every race except in China.

In , Cortese rode for the Finnish Ajo Motorsport team that took Di Meglio to his 125cc World Championship. He replaced Di Meglio and teamed up with Dominique Aegerter, running factory Derbi RSA 125 bikes. Cortese finished on the podium three times and ended up sixth in the championship.

For 2010 he rode a Derbi again, for Ajo Motorsport. He was teamed up with Marc Márquez and Adrián Martín, with each rider running different sponsorship. Cortese took two podiums during the season, at the Sachsenring and Indianapolis. He also achieved pole position in Italy, and finished seventh in the championship.

For the  season, Cortese moved to Dirk Heidolf's Racing Team Germany outfit, as a single-bike entry. He took second-place finishes in Qatar and Portugal, before taking his first Grand Prix victory – in his 109th start – in the Czech Republic, having battled with Johann Zarco in the closing stages of the race. Cortese eventually ended the season fourth in the championship.

Moto2 World Championship
Cortese moved up to Moto2 class as a Moto3 champion in 2013. He joined Dynavolt Intact GP as the sole rider of the team. In 2014, Cortese recorded his first podium finish in Moto2 at Brno. He remained at the team until the end of 2017 season.

Supersport World Championship
After failing to secure a ride for 2018 Moto2 season, Cortese signed a deal with Kallio Racing to race in Supersport World Championship, aboard Yamaha YZF-R6. He won 2 races at Aragon and Donington Park, securing 8 podium finishes and became the champion of 2018 Supersport World Championship in his maiden season.

Superbike World Championship 
He promoted to Superbike class for 2019 season, signing for GRT Yamaha World SBK team where he finished 12th in the standings. The following year he moved to Team Pedercini, switched bike from Yamaha to Kawasaki. He crashed in the first race of Portimao round, suffering multiple injuries which he would recover from after 8 months. He did not participate for the rest of the season, and his place was taken over by Roman Ramos, Valentin Debise, and Loris Cresson respectively.

Retirement
Twenty months after his crash at Portimão, Cortese announced his retirement from motorcycle racing on his own Instagram account. He credited local emergency medical efforts for saving him from paraplegia but noted that his body has never fully recovered from the accident. Cortese is due to start a job at one of his former sponsors, Gutmann Gruppe.

Career statistics

Grand Prix motorcycle racing

By season

By class

Races by year
(key) (Races in bold indicate pole position, races in italics indicate fastest lap)

Supersport World Championship

Races by year
(key) (Races in bold indicate pole position; races in italics indicate fastest lap)

Superbike World Championship

Races by year
(key) (Races in bold indicate pole position) (Races in italics indicate fastest lap)

References

External links

 
 

1990 births
Living people
People from Ochsenhausen
Sportspeople from Tübingen (region)
German motorcycle racers
125cc World Championship riders
German people of Italian descent
Moto3 World Championship riders
Moto2 World Championship riders
Supersport World Championship riders
Superbike World Championship riders
Moto3 World Riders' Champions